Kataklysm are a Canadian death metal band. They have released fourteen studio albums, one EP and two DVDs as of 2020. Kataklysm won their first Juno Award (Canadian equivalent of the Grammy) for best album of the year in the "heavy metal" category for their 2015 album Of Ghosts & Gods. The band's albums have charted throughout the world, including the Billboard Top 100 in the United States.

Biography 

Kataklysm was formed in Montreal, Quebec in September 1991. At the beginning of their career, they were known for their fast and technical brand of death metal, known as the "Northern Hyperblast". Nuclear Blast Records soon took notice of the band in 1992 after noticing the band's debut demo The Death Gate Cycle of Reincarnation, which gained significant praise from the underground metal scene. In 1994, Kataklysm signed to Nuclear Blast and released their first EP The Mystical Gate of Reincarnation, followed by their debut album Sorcery in 1995. This was followed in 1996 by their second full-length album Temple of Knowledge, which they accompanied with their first music video for the album's track, "The Awakener". Following the release of this album however, founding member and lead vocalist Sylvain Houde departed from the band. This, as Houde himself confessed, was due to the emotional effects surrounding the end of his romantic relationship. Subsequently, the band's bassist Maurizio Iacono replaced Houde as vocalist, ceding his duties as bassist to Stephane Barbe. The band's musical direction shifted from being primarily spearheaded by Houde to both Iacono and founding guitarist JF Dagenais instead.

In 1998, the band released their third studio album Victims of this Fallen World, (Iacono's first as vocalist) which has been noted as incorporating a more groove-oriented and melodic musical style of death metal. The following album The Prophecy (Stigmata of the Immaculate) released in 2000 consolidated this style, lessening the chaotic nature of their work thus far and incorporating greater influences from thrash metal. The band's 2001 album Epic: The Poetry of War added further melody to the band's approach to death metal and the band continued to gain attention and positive critical reception. In the following year, the band released Shadows & Dust, which has been viewed by critics as one of the band's most successful releases because of the overwhelmingly positive reception the band received and the increase in sales compared to the band's prior releases, being the first album to chart in countries such as Germany, Austria and Switzerland, and featured one of the band's most recognisable tracks: "In Shadows & Dust".

Two years later, in 2004, the band released Serenity in Fire. The album was notable for the absence of drummer Max Duhamel, Kataklysm's drummer, being temporarily replaced by Martin Maurais, due to injury. The album was again positively received and featured two of the band's best known tracks: "As I Slither" and "The Ambassador of Pain". Duhamel eventually recovered and played on the band's eighth studio album, released in 2006, titled In the Arms of Devastation. The album was a considerable success, with sales exceeding 50,000 units and saw the band's highest charting entries thus far. The band's following album, Prevail, continued to display the band's growing popularity, with sales again exceeding the 50,000 mark. The album's single "Taking the World by Storm" also became the band's most highly viewed track on YouTube, with over three million views.

The band released their 11th studio album Waiting for the End to Come on October 29, 2013, followed by their twelfth album Of Ghosts and Gods on July 31, 2015, both to high praise. The band's thirteenth studio album, Meditations, was released in June 2018. The album gained their first album to chart on the Billboard Top 100 charts, positioning at #61, alongside being their highest-charting album in Germany, Austria, Switzerland, and the band's native Canada.

Kataklysm released their fourteenth studio album Unconquered on September 25, 2020. Three weeks before the album's release, the band announced drummer Oli Beaudoin had left the band and was replaced by James Payne.

Influences
Members of Kataklysm have cited major influences as Metallica, Megadeth, Slayer, Anthrax, Pantera, Sepultura, Exhorder, Testament, Death, At the Gates, Napalm Death, Obituary, Cannibal Corpse, Kreator, Exodus, Fear Factory, Carcass and Entombed.

Members 

Current members
 Maurizio Iacono – vocals , bass 
 Jean-François Dagenais – guitars 
 Stephane Barbe – bass 
 James Payne – drums 

Former members
 Sylvain Houde – vocals 
 Stephane Coté – guitars 
 Ariel Saied Martinez – drums 
 Mark Marino – drums 
 Max Duhamel – drums 
 Nick Miller – drums 
 Jean-François Richard – drums 
 Martin Maurais – drums 
 Oli Beaudoin – drums 

Timeline

Discography 

 Sorcery (1995)
 Temple of Knowledge (1996)
 Victims of this Fallen World (1998)
 The Prophecy (Stigmata of the Immaculate) (2000)
 Epic: The Poetry of War (2001)
 Shadows & Dust (2002)
 Serenity in Fire (2004)
 In the Arms of Devastation (2006)
 Prevail (2008)
 Heaven's Venom (2010)
 Waiting for the End to Come (2013)
 Of Ghosts and Gods (2015)
 Meditations (2018)
 Unconquered (2020)

Awards and nominations

References

External links

 

Canadian death metal musical groups
Canadian melodic death metal musical groups
Musical groups established in 1991
Musical groups from Montreal
Nuclear Blast artists
1991 establishments in Quebec
Juno Award for Heavy Metal Album of the Year winners